Félix Bédouret (1897 – 30 June 1955) was a Swiss football (soccer) player who competed in the 1924 Summer Olympics. He was a member of the Swiss team, which won the silver medal in the football tournament.

References

Sources
 Félix Bédouret's profile at databaseOlympics

External links

1897 births
1955 deaths
Swiss men's footballers
Footballers at the 1924 Summer Olympics
Olympic footballers of Switzerland
Olympic silver medalists for Switzerland
Switzerland international footballers
Olympic medalists in football
Medalists at the 1924 Summer Olympics
Association football forwards
Servette FC players